Laura Hill (born 22 May 1976 in Chesterfield) is a professional squash player who represented England. She reached a career-high world ranking of World No. 43 in March 2008.

References

External links 

English female squash players
Living people
1976 births
Sportspeople from Chesterfield, Derbyshire